The Chong Hing Finance Center is a 36-storey Grade A commercial building, located at 288 Nanjing Road West in the Huang Pu District of Shanghai, China.

See also
 List of tallest buildings in Shanghai

References

Buildings and structures in Shanghai
Huangpu District, Shanghai